Agua Fría  is a corregimiento in Chepigana District, Darién Province, Panama with a population of 2,692 . It was created by Law 58 of July 29, 1998, owing to the Declaration of Unconstitutionality of Law 1 of 1982. Its population as of 2000 was 2,812.

References

Corregimientos of Darién Province